(born March 16, 1970) is a Japanese video game director, producer, designer and screenwriter. Since 2008, Iizuka has been the vice president of product development for the Sonic the Hedgehog series at Sega, as well as the head of Sonic Team although he has been working on games in the Sonic series since 1994.

Early career
His first collaboration with Sega involved working with Sega Technical Institute on Sonic the Hedgehog 3 as a designer. Later, he helped supervise Traveller's Tales with the development of Sonic R. He was also the lead designer for Nights into Dreams, and director for Sonic Adventure.

Sega
In 1999, he and a small part of Sonic Team moved to San Francisco to establish Sonic Team USA (later renamed Sega Studio USA), in order to gain feedback from the western market. Over in the U.S. his team worked on the international release of Sonic Adventure. Afterward, his team started to develop their own games, where he was the director and lead designer for Sonic Adventure 2, Sonic Heroes, Shadow the Hedgehog, and Nights: Journey of Dreams. In an effort to further broaden Sonic's appeal to western markets, Iizuka gave western developer, Backbone Entertainment, a shot at developing Sonic titles (Sonic Rivals and Sonic Rivals 2) under his team's supervision for the PlayStation Portable console.

In 2008, Sega's American division, Sega Studio USA, was absorbed back into Sonic Team Japan, making Iizuka the producer for the Sonic series at Sonic Team and the head of the company as well. In 2016, Iizuka relocated to Los Angeles to become the VP of Product Development at Sega of America, while retaining his title as the head of Sonic Team.

In 2022, it was revealed that Iizuka designed a game named Devi & Pii for the Sega Genesis in 1992, but it was never released. It would finally be released on October 27, 2022 for the Sega Genesis Mini 2, however.

Legacy
Game journalist from Wired described Takashi Iizuka as a difficult man to read, as he tends to slip into corporate speak especially when discussing mixed reception of Sonic games. His long time colleague and composer, Tomoko Sasaki, however described him as someone who "offered a different and fresh, almost unpredictable, way of thinking" and got along well with him from the very start.

Works

References

Living people
Japanese video game designers
1970 births
Sega people
Japanese video game producers
Japanese video game directors
People from Kawaguchi, Saitama